Grande Fratello VIP (as known by the acronym GFVIP) is the celebrity version of the Italian reality television franchise Big Brother. It's the first season of the show, it was launched on September 19, 2016 on Canale 5, with Ilary Blasi as presentator of the grand gala show on air every Monday evening, and Alfonso Signorini as opinionist. The 24h live was broadcast on Mediaset Extra and Mediaset Premium, daily pillows were broadcast on Canale 5 and La5. The show was scheduled to air for 8 weeks. The winner was Alessia Macari.

Housemates
The age of the housemates refers to the time of entry into the house.

Nominations table

 Blue team (Week 1 - 2)
 Red team (Week 1 - 2)

Note

: Housemates are divided into two teams. Red team: Clemente, Costantino, Gabriele, Laura, Valeria and Mariana; Blue team: Alessia, Andrea, Antonella & Asia, Bosco, Elenoire, Pamela and Stefano. Housemates only able to nominate one housemate from their team.
: Andrea is the winner of the challenge, he got the power to save one housemate from eviction. He chose to save Antonella & Asia. Alessia, Clemente and Mariana are still nominated.
: Clemente was ejected due to his homophobic and misogynistic sentences.
: Alessia is the winner of the challenge. Mariana got the immunity. 
: Pamela was ejected because she does not observed the rules shared by the program.
: Valeria is the winner of the challenge. Housemates got the power to save one housemate from elimination: Antonella, Asia and Laura were at risk. Valeria chose Antonella as the first nominated of the week.
: Housemates nominated a housemate each one: Alessia, Antonella, Bosco, Gabriele, Laura, Valeria were the most nominated and both went to the televoting. The first who got most votes was chosen as a finalist. 
: Bosco is the winner of the challenge. He got a power: his nominations worth 2 votes each one.
: As a group, four male housemates had to nominate two female housemates. As a group, four female housemates had to nominate two male housemates. Andrea, Bosco, Laura and Valeria were the four potential nominees. The four housemates not nominated had to make a nomination, they could only choose one of the nominees. Valeria and Bosco received the most nominations therefore facing public vote.
: Andrea, Elenoire, Gabriele, Laura have chosen to side with Valeria, while Stefano with Mariana. Valeria, as winner of the televoting against Mariana, nominated Elenoire. Both Eleonoire and Stefano facing public vote.
: Andrea was the most nominated by the housemates: he got the right to be a finalist. Andrea chosen another housemate to fight for the title. Andrea and Stefano facing public vote.
: Housemates chosen the third finalist: Valeria was the most nominated.
: Gabriele and Laura facing the public vote: who receives most votes is the fourth finalist.
: Alessia and Stefano nominated Valeria. Valeria and Gabriele nominated Stefano. Both Stefano and Valeria picked a card, Stefano went to televoting, but he chosen to go with Gabriele. Gabriele won the televoting, he chosen to go in a further televoting against Valeria.
: At the final round, the public were voting to win rather than to evict.

TV Ratings
The live show was broadcast on Canale 5 every Monday evening for about 4 hours.

References

External links 
 Official site 

2016 Italian television seasons
01